Hypidalia enervis is a moth of the subfamily Arctiinae first described by Schaus in 1894. It is found in Brazil and Paraguay.

References

Phaegopterina